Heterallactis euchrysa is a moth of the family Erebidae. It was described by Edward Meyrick in 1886. It is found in the Australian states of Queensland and New South Wales.

The forewings are dark brown with two broad yellow bands.

The larvae feed on lichen.

References

Nudariina
Moths described in 1886